Downtown Summerlin is a  commercial and residential neighborhood located in Summerlin South, a suburban area on the western outskirts of Las Vegas, Nevada.

The Downtown Summerlin neighborhood includes:

 The Downtown Summerlin shopping center
 The Red Rock Casino, Resort & Spa
 The City National Arena (the team headquarters for the Vegas Golden Knights NHL franchise and the UNLV Rebels hockey program)
 The Las Vegas Ballpark (the home of the Las Vegas Aviators minor league baseball team)
 One Summerlin (a nine-story office tower) and Two Summerlin (a six-story office tower)
 Constellation and Tanager (apartment complexes)

The area is bounded by Sahara Avenue to the south, CC 215 to the west, Charleston Boulevard to the north, and Town Center Drive to the east.

History 
Downtown Summerlin is located in the community of Summerlin South, Nevada, in a village known as Summerlin Centre, which is bordered by Charleston Boulevard to the north, Sahara Avenue to the south, Hualapai Way to the east and Desert Foothills Drive to the west. Downtown Summerlin's north and south boundaries are the same, but it is bordered by the 215 Beltway to the west and Town Center Drive to the east. Aside from being located on 400 acres in the middle of Summerlin Centre, Downtown Summerlin was also once planned under the name "Summerlin Centre".

The Howard Hughes Corporation began planning Summerlin, Nevada in the late 1980s, along with plans to build a town center, which would ultimately become the village of Summerlin Centre. Tom Warden, vice president of community relations for Howard Hughes Corporation, said the village of Summerlin Centre would be "the center of Summerlin geographically, as well as many other ways. It will be the center of entertainment, business, retail, culture and education." The town center would include a shopping mall, office space, and a casino resort, as well as movie theaters and restaurants.

The planned Summerlin Town Center project would include the proposed mall as well as office space. The project would be developed by The Rouse Company and its subsidiary, The Howard Hughes Corporation. Development of the Summerlin Centre village was underway in 1999. The village was expected to take five years to complete, with the mall scheduled to open in 2004. By December 2003, the upcoming Red Rock Resort by Station Casinos was intended as the centerpiece of a planned downtown Summerlin area, known then as Summerlin Centre or Summerlin Town Centre. Summerlin Town Centre would include the proposed mall – rescheduled to open in 2006 or 2007 – as well as office and residential components.

A groundbreaking ceremony was held for the Red Rock Resort on April 15, 2004. Later that year, General Growth Properties (GGP) purchased The Rouse Company and its Howard Hughes subsidiary, gaining control of property that was intended for other portions of the Summerlin Centre project. In October 2005, ground was broken on the property for a new  headquarters for Business Bank of Nevada. Summerlin Centre was to feature at least  of office space upon completion. The Red Rock Resort opened in April 2006, as part of the Summerlin Centre project.

In May 2006, GGP announced details regarding the 400-acre mixed-use project, which would feature  of retail space, including four anchor stores. Other planned features of Summerlin Centre included restaurants; office space; a 250-room, 11-story hotel; and at least 5,500 residences, ranging from houses to condominiums. GGP planned to begin construction of Summerlin Centre in spring 2007, with a grand opening scheduled for fall 2008. Construction on the mall stopped in 2008, as GGP was experiencing financial difficulties. Construction of an office building, part of the mixed-use project, was also halted. The Howard Hughes Corporation took over the mixed-use project in 2010.

By December 2012, the Howard Hughes Corporation had plans for 200 acres of vacant land located along the east side of the 400-acre parcel. The eventual plans would include residential, office, and entertainment space. There was also the possibility of a baseball stadium being built on the land. The Howard Hughes Corporation resumed construction of the mixed-use project in July 2013. By that time, there were also plans to include a 9,000-seat baseball stadium for the Las Vegas 51s team. It would be developed by the Howard Hughes Corporation and Play Ball Owners Group, both owners of the team. It would be built on 20 acres, at a cost of $60 million.

In November 2013, it was stated that the 400-acre Summerlin Centre project would eventually become known as Downtown Summerlin. The mall component, once known as The Shops at Summerlin, was touted as the beginning of the Downtown Summerlin project, although several buildings had already existed within the 400-acre project, including the Red Rock resort, a fitness center, and the bank building. The final cost of Downtown Summerlin, including the Red Rock Resort and future development, was expected to total at least $1 billion. Howard Hughes Corporation added traffic lights and sidewalks in one area to provide nearby residents with easy pedestrian access to Downtown Summerlin and the Red Rock Resort. Both businesses were expected to benefit from one another. The resort also underwent a $35 million renovation that was timed to coincide with the opening of the Downtown Summerlin shopping center.

Shopping center 

The Downtown Summerlin shopping center opened on October 9, 2014, with 85 of its 125 stores ready for business. Additional stores were scheduled to open in the coming months. The shopping center also includes various restaurants and a Regal Cinemas movie theater. The retail component was considered the first phase of Downtown Summerlin, while the second phase would consist of a residential component.

Office space 

One Summerlin, a LEED-certified, nine-story office building, opened at Downtown Summerlin in April 2015. It includes  of Class A office space. According to Howard Hughes CEO David Weinreb, One Summerlin is what makes Downtown Summerlin a "downtown," saying, "There was never a question that we needed to build the office building to really ground it as a downtown." The tower is located within the shopping center. The ground floor contains retail space, while the remaining floors are dedicated to office tenants. Other office tenants have included Fox Rothschild and Ballard Spahr. Some tenants in the building received discounted memberships to the TPC at Summerlin golf course, making it the only office tower in the Las Vegas Valley to do so.

By December 2016, Howard Hughes Corporation was planning to add a second office tower. The building cost $49 million, and is located on Downtown Summerlin's east parcel, across from the Red Rock Resort. The Howard Hughes Corporation relocated its headquarters to Two Summerlin in July 2019. Other major tenants have included Greenberg Traurig, CliftonLarsonAllen, and WeWork.

In 2021, construction began on a third office building known as 1700 Pavilion. The 10-story building was constructed on three acres, located south of the Las Vegas Ballpark. Howard Hughes Corporation had previously planned a 14-story hotel for the site, prior to the COVID-19 pandemic. 1700 Pavilion is expected to cost $120 million, and is scheduled to open in October 2022. The building's major tenants include two law firms and Wynn Design & Development, a subsidiary of Wynn Resorts.

Residential 
Downtown Summerlin's second phase, being planned as of 2014, would involve housing development on the land along the eastern side of the parcel. The second phase would have 4,000 housing units, including townhouses, apartments, and residential buildings up to 20 stories in height. Over the next decade, the housing development was expected to have capacity for up to 10,000 residents. There were no plans to include single-family homes.

In April 2014, the Howard Hughes Corporation announced plans for the first residential project in Downtown Summerlin: a three-story, 124-unit, gated apartment complex. It would be a joint venture of the Hughes Corporation and Calida Group, built on 4.5 acres, located northeast of the shopping center. Construction of the apartment complex, named Constellation, began in late 2014. The name is a reference to the Lockheed Constellation, which was financed by Howard Hughes during the 1940s and 1950s. Completion was originally scheduled for late 2015, but was delayed until the following year. Construction was scheduled to conclude in October 2016, although some residents began moving in two months prior.

In September 2017, Howard Hughes Corporation was planning a second Downtown Summerlin apartment complex, to be built on nine acres at the northeast corner of Sahara Avenue and Pavilion Center Drive. Construction of the new $59 million apartment complex was underway in February 2018, and the name was unveiled to be "Tanager" the following year. Like the Constellation, Tanager is also named after an airplane, the Curtiss Tanager. Future residential projects in Downtown Summerlin will continue the theme of aviation names to reflect Hughes' aviation career. The first residents began moving into Tanager in August 2019. The complex has 267 units. It is the first apartment complex in Summerlin to be designed entirely by Howard Hughes Corporation. The apartment complex's second phase, called Tanager Echo, began construction in 2021. It will include 295 units, in buildings ranging from five to six stories, and is scheduled to open in 2023.

Other development 
The City National Arena opened at Downtown Summerlin in 2017, followed by the Las Vegas Ballpark in 2019; both are located on Downtown Summerlin's eastern 200-acre parcel, and are north of the Tanager apartment complex. As of 2019, there were 160 remaining acres awaiting development in Downtown Summerlin. Future development over the next 10 years would include more businesses and more than 4,000 residential units, to be built near the ballpark and City National Arena. In addition to more residential projects, other plans would include additional office and retail space.

Gallery

References

External links 
 Official website

Summerlin, Nevada
Mixed-use developments in the United States